Najaf Qoli Qeshlaqi (also Romanized as Najaf Qolī Qeshlāqī; also known as Najaf ‘Alī Kandī and Najaf Qolī Kandī) is a village in Ojarud-e Shomali Rural District, in the Central District of Germi County, Ardabil Province, Iran. At the 2006 census, its population was 348, in 61 families.

References 

Towns and villages in Germi County